FAPE can refer to:

Free Appropriate Public Education, an educational right of children with disabilities in the United States
Foundation for Art and Preservation in Embassies
FAPE, the ICAO code for Port Elizabeth Airport in Port Elizabeth, South Africa
Fund for Assistance to Private Education, a non-profit organization in the Philippines